Oxford Town Hall is a public building in St Aldate's Street in central Oxford, England. It is both the seat of Oxford City Council and a venue for public meetings, entertainment and other events. It also includes the Museum of Oxford. Although Oxford is a city with its own charter, the building is referred to as the "Town Hall". It is Oxford's third seat of government to have stood on the same site. The present building, completed in 1897, is Grade II* listed.

History
Oxford's guildhall was created by substantially repairing or rebuilding a house on the current site in about 1292. It was replaced by a new building, designed by Isaac Ware in the Italianate style in 1752. In 1891, an architectural design competition was held for a new building on the same site. The local architect Henry Hare won with a Jacobethan design. The 1752 building was demolished in 1893. Hare's new building included new premises for Oxford's Crown and County Courts, central public library and police station as well as the city council. The Prince of Wales opened the new building in May 1897, about a month before the Diamond Jubilee of Queen Victoria.

University of Oxford undergraduates were expected to mount a large demonstration for the opening, so a detachment of the Metropolitan Police Mounted Branch was deployed to reinforce the small Oxford City Police force. The Metropolitan officers were unused to Oxford undergraduates, and considered the boisterous crowd a danger. The officers attacked the crowd with batons, causing several serious injuries. The crowd reciprocated, unhorsing one officer and trampling him. A young law don, FE Smith, who had taken no part in the violence, saw police mishandling his college servant. Smith went to rescue his servant but was arrested. He became the first prisoner in one of the cells of the new police station in the new Town Hall. Smith was charged with obstructing police officers in the execution of their duty, but at his trial the young lawyer was found not guilty.

The police station was at the rear in Blue Boar Street. It was completed later than the rest of the building, but the Oxford City Police force was able to move there from its former station in Kemp Hall by the turn of the century. The City Council was accused of greatly exceeding the budget it set for the building project. In 1905 Henry Taunt published a leaflet in which he stated that the building was meant to cost £47,000 but ended up costing £100,000.

In the First World War the building was converted into the Town Hall section of the 3rd Southern General Hospital. From 1916 it specialised in treating soldiers suffering from malaria.

Oxford City Police moved to a new police station further down St Aldate's in 1936 and the central public library moved to new facilities at Westgate Centre in Queen Street which were completed in 1972.

The town hall was the headquarters of the county borough for much of the 20th century and remained the seat of government after Oxford City Council was formed in 1974.

Works of art in the town hall include a portraits of King James II, Queen Anne and the Duke of Marlborough by Godfrey Kneller, a painting depicting the Rape of the Sabine Women by Pietro da Cortona and a painting depicting Saint Peter by Francesco Fontebasso.

See also
 Museum of Oxford, situated inside Oxford Town Hall
 Guild
 Guildhall

References

Sources and further reading

External links

Buildings by Henry Hare
City and town halls in Oxfordshire
Government buildings completed in 1897
Grade II* listed buildings in Oxford
Jacobethan architecture
Town Hall